Kerrin Charters Harrison (born 27 April 1964) is a New Zealand badminton player.

Along with Glenn Stewart, he won a bronze medal in the badminton men's doubles at the 1986 Commonwealth Games in Edinburgh, Scotland.

He attended Westlake Boys High School on the North Shore, Auckland from 1979 to 1982. Kerrin won the men's French Badminton singles open in 1986. And along with Glenn Stewart also won the men's French Badminton doubles open in 1986. Along with Phillip Horne, Kerrin Harrison represented New Zealand in Badminton men's doubles, at the 1990 Commonwealth Games in Auckland, New Zealand.

At the age of 28 Kerrin represented New Zealand at the 1992 summer Olympics in Barcelona in both the men's singles and doubles for Badminton He was a New Zealand representative for ten years. He won the men's masters (over 45s) Badminton singles in New Zealand, 17–20 September 2009.

References

External links
https://web.archive.org/web/20090206064048/http://homepages.ihug.co.nz/~wlake/awards/awards.pdf
http://www.sportingpulse.com/assoc_page.cgi?c=1-2406-0-0-0&news_task=DETAIL&articleID=9984537

New Zealand male badminton players
Olympic badminton players of New Zealand
Badminton players at the 1990 Commonwealth Games
Living people
1964 births
Badminton players at the 1992 Summer Olympics
Commonwealth Games bronze medallists for New Zealand
Badminton players at the 1986 Commonwealth Games
Commonwealth Games medallists in badminton
20th-century New Zealand people
21st-century New Zealand people
Medallists at the 1986 Commonwealth Games